Henrique Marques (born 24 September 1996) is a Brazilian fencer. He competed in the men's foil event at the 2016 Summer Olympics.

References

External links
 

1996 births
Living people
Brazilian male foil fencers
Olympic fencers of Brazil
Fencers at the 2016 Summer Olympics
Place of birth missing (living people)
Pan American Games medalists in fencing
Pan American Games silver medalists for Brazil
Fencers at the 2019 Pan American Games
Medalists at the 2019 Pan American Games
21st-century Brazilian people